Kirsi Irene Rauta (born March 17, 1962 in Kouvola) is a retired female marathon runner from Finland. She represented her native country at the 1996 Summer Olympics in Atlanta, United States, where she didn't finish in the women's marathon race. She set her personal best (2:28:00) on April 2, 1995 at the London Marathon.

Achievements

References

sports-reference

1962 births
Living people
People from Kouvola
Finnish female long-distance runners
Athletes (track and field) at the 1996 Summer Olympics
Olympic athletes of Finland
Finnish female marathon runners
Sportspeople from Kymenlaakso